Charles Thomson (1729–1824) was secretary of the Continental Congress.

Charles or Charlie Thomson may also refer to:

 Charles Thomson (artist) (born 1953), English Stuckist artist, painter, poet, photographer
 Charlie Thomson (1930–2009), Scottish football goalkeeper who played for Clyde, Chelsea and Nottingham Forest
 Charlie Thomson (footballer, born 1905) (1905–1965), father of the above, Scottish football goalkeeper who played for Falkirk, Brighton & Hove Albion and others
 Charles Thomson (footballer, born 1878) (1878–1936), full name Charles Bellany Thomson, Scottish footballer who played for Heart of Midlothian and Sunderland
 Charles Thomson (footballer, born 1910) (1910–1984), full name Charles Morgan Thomson, Scottish footballer who played for Sunderland
 Charles Antoine François Thomson (1845–1898), French colonial administrator
 Charles M. Thomson (1877–1943), U.S. Representative from Illinois
 Charles Poulett Thomson, 1st Baron Sydenham (1799–1841), first Governor of the united Province of Canada
 Charles Wyville Thomson (1830–1882), professor of zoology and chief scientist on the Challenger expedition
 Charles Thomson (cricketer) (born 1969), Indian cricketer and coach
 Charles Thomson (journalist) (born 1988), British journalist specializing in popular black music

See also 
Charles Thompson (disambiguation)